Darwin most often refers to:

 Charles Darwin (1809–1882), English naturalist and writer, best known as the originator of the theory of biological evolution by natural selection
 Charles Galton Darwin (1887–1962), English physicist, grandson of Charles Darwin
 Darwin, Northern Territory, a capital city in Australia
 Darwin (surname), a surname (including a list of people with the name) 

Darwin may also refer to:

Arts and entertainment
 Darwin (1920 film), a German silent film
 Darwin (2011 film), a documentary
 Darwin (2015 film), a science fiction film by Alain Desrochers
 Darwin (seaQuest DSV), a dolphin in the TV series seaQuest DSV
 Darwin!, a 1972 album by Banco del Mutuo Soccorso
 Darwin: The Life of a Tormented Evolutionist, a 1991 biography of Charles Darwin
 Darwin (Marvel Comics), a fictional character in the Marvel Comics Universe associated with the X-Men
 Darwin Watterson, a character from the 2011 TV series The Amazing World of Gumball

Astronomy
 1991 Darwin, a main-belt asteroid
 Darwin (lunar crater)
 Darwin (Martian crater)
 Darwin (spacecraft), a European Space Agency project

Computing
 Darwin (ADL), an architecture description language
 Darwin (operating system), the Unix base for Apple's iOS and macOS operating systems
 Darwin (programming game)
 Darwin (programming language)
 Darwin Information Typing Architecture
 Darwin Streaming Server

Places

Antarctica
 Darwin Glacier (Antarctica), Oates Land
 Darwin Mountains, Oates Land

Australia

Northern Territory
 Darwin, Northern Territory
 Darwin River, Northern Territory
 City of Darwin
 Division of Darwin, a 1903–1955 election division

Tasmania
 Darwin, Tasmania, a short-lived community
 Darwin Crater, a suspected meteorite impact crater

Chile
 Darwin Channel
 Darwin Sound
 Cordillera Darwin, Tierra del Fuego, a mountain range

United States
 Darwin, California, an unincorporated community
 Darwin Falls, a waterfall in California
 Darwin Township, Clark County, Illinois
 Darwin, Illinois, an unincorporated community in the township
 Darwin, Minnesota, a city in Meeker County
 Darwin, Ohio, an unincorporated community
 Darwin, Oklahoma, an unincorporated community
 Darwin, Texas, a ghost town
 Darwin, Virginia, an unincorporated community
 Darwin Township, Meeker County, Minnesota

Other
 Darwin (ward), an electoral ward in Greater London
 Darwin, Río Negro, Argentina, a municipality
 Darwin, Falkland Islands, a settlement
 Darwin Island, Galapagos Islands
 Mount Darwin (disambiguation)

Schools in England
 Darwin College, Cambridge
 Darwin College, Kent

Sport
 Darwin Baseball League, a North Australian league
 Darwin Rugby League, a North Australian league

Transport
 Darwin Airline, an airline in Switzerland
 Darwin International Airport, an airport in Australia

Other uses
 Darwin (given name), a given name (including a list of people with the name)
 Darwin (monkey), a rhesus macaque colloquially referred to as the "Ikea Monkey"
 Darwin (unit), a unit of evolutionary change
 Darwin Awards, tongue-in-cheek awards for people who remove themselves from reproducing through their stupidity
 Darwin Medal, awarded by the Royal Society for biology
 Darwin Shopping Centre, Shrewsbury
 The Darwin Centre, Natural History Museum, London

See also
 
 Port Darwin (disambiguation)
 XDarwin
 Darvin (disambiguation)
 Darwen (disambiguation)